Nonpoint is the seventh studio album by American rock band Nonpoint, released on October 9, 2012 via Razor & Tie. It was produced and engineered by Johnny K (Disturbed, Staind, Sevendust) at Groovemaster Studios in Chicago, Illinois. In June 2012, the band released two songs from the album, "I Said It" and "Left for You", the latter of which serves as the album's lead single. This is the first album to feature guitarists Rasheed Thomas and Dave Lizzio, and bassist Adam Woloszyn.

Recording and production
The album was produced/mixed by producer Johnny K at Groovemaster Studios in Chicago, Illinois, and features additional production and mixing from Brian Virtue features new lineup and label. Soriano explains the new album, "We wanted this record to be a punch in the face. There was a lot of stuff I wanted to artistically vent about. It's a fresh start for us. We felt like having a self-titled record says it all. We hit the reset button, and there's life again. You can hear it musically. We're not going anywhere." "This album is the beginning of a brand new chapter in the world of NONPOINT... rejuvenated and full of positivity," adds Rivera. "Elias has written his most personal lyrics yet that shows the signs of endurance this band has had in our 15-year career."

Reception

Eduardo Rivadavia of AllMusic gave the album a mixed review and has compared its sound to contemporary post-grunge bands such as Nickelback and 3 Doors Down, writing "Nonpoint's eponymous seventh album sees them moving ever closer to the corporate rock of Nickelback or 3 Doors Down, which may seem like a long way removed from their Floridian nu-metal roots alongside Limp Bizkit, Cold, and other musical crimes against humanity."

Track listing

Personnel 

Members
Elias Soriano - lead vocals
Robb Rivera - drums
Rasheed Thomas - rhythm guitar, backing vocals
Adam Woloszyn - bass
Dave Lizzio - lead guitar, backing vocals

Production
Produced and mixed by Johnny K and Brian Virtue at Groovemaster Studios, Chicago, Illinois
Engineered by John Karkazis, Brian Virtue, Matt Dougherty, Daniel Salcido and Jeremy Nolan
Mastered by Brad Blackwood
Additional composer: Rob Graves
Booking by Dan Devita and Andrew Goodfriend
A&R by Pete Giberga
Artwork and design by Jeff Chenault
Photo by Ryan Baker

References

Nonpoint albums
2012 albums
Razor & Tie albums